Thoressa evershedi, the Evershed's ace, is a butterfly belonging to the family Hesperiidae.W. H. Evans described it from Palni Hills in 1910 and named it after Evershed as he was the first person to collect it.

Description

Range
The butterfly occurs in western Tamil Nadu, eastern  Kerala. It is an occasional visitor to south-western Karnataka.

References

e
Butterflies of Asia